Meme  is a 2018 independent drama film directed by Sean Mannion. The film had its world premiere at the Art of Brooklyn Film Festival in 2018, where it was awarded Outstanding Narrative Feature. The film stars Sarah Schoofs as Jennifer, a freelancer whose quest to find the creator of a surreal mashup VHS tape leads her to finding herself.

Synopsis
Jennifer is a young Brooklyn freelancer dissatisfied with her job and her relationship with Tommy, a VHS collector. She discovers a surreal mashup videotape among Tommy's friend's tapes labeled 'Meme'. As her life spirals out of control, she searches for the tape's creator, in order to find answers about its contents.

Cast 
 Sarah Schools as Jennifer
 Shivantha Wijesinha as Tommy
 Lauren A. Kennedy as Lesley
 Kitty Ostapowciz as Carrie
 Chaz H. Cleveland as Kyle
 June Dare as Larraine
 Alex Bone as Marcus
 Tara Cioletti as Dr. Danielle Blackmore
 Matthew K. Addison as Craig (as Matthew Addison)
 Phillip Andry as Carlos
 Lauren Shaw as Lee
 Corinne Fisher as Woman in Bathroom

Critical response
Meme received mixed reviews from critics during its festival run and U.S. independent theatre tour.

M. Faust of The Public referred to the film as a "fascinating independent feature". Kevin Rakestraw of Film Pulse praised the film's use of commercials for fictional products and films to build a new world while also commenting that performances came off as emotionally monotone.

In contrast, Kirk Fernwood of One Film Fan praised the performances and said, "What could have been your average tale of a broken relationship, self-doubt, and battling alcoholism gets a definitive indie makeover plus unique execution that ventures into the experimental/idiosyncratic/darkly humorous veins and sends the viewer on an unconventional adventure of one young woman’s fight for identity and value."

Mike Haberfelner of Search My Trash said that the film was "a wonderful, at times otherworldly puzzle, held together by a strong ensemble with Sarah Schoofs giving her all in the lead." Tasha Danzig of The Movie Sleuth wrote that "the film was surprisingly done well for an internet movie - "from an original way of presenting interactions by utilizing scene backgrounds, to the sound use of periodical intercut scenes that reiterate the main character’s realisations to effectively portray the elements of Jennifer’s crumbling relationship."

Charlie Nicholson praised the film for its ambition, while also criticising the philosophy that dominates the Meme tape that Jennifer investigates. He mentioned that "in what ultimately uses a mystery setup to interrogate questions of existence and identity, the reams of cluttered campus waffle sometimes prevents its tenser moments becoming as effective as they could have been." Alex Saveliev similarly criticised the philosophising and stylistic choices of the film asking: "to what end? Meme is chock-full of odd choices that seem purposeful and the director or screenwriter divulge some inner demons only they can explain."

References

External links
 

2018 films
2018 drama films
2018 independent films
2010s English-language films